Nguyễn is the most common Vietnamese surname. Outside of Vietnam, the surname is commonly rendered without diacritics as Nguyen. Nguyên is a different word and surname.

By some estimates 39 percent of Vietnamese people bear this surname.

Origin and usage
"Nguyễn" is the spelling of the Sino-Vietnamese pronunciation of the Han character 阮. The same Han character is often romanized as Ruǎn in Mandarin, Yuen in Cantonese, Gnieuh or Nyoe¹  in Wu Chinese, or Nguang in Hokchew. . Hanja reading (Korean) is 완 (Wan) or 원 (Won) and in Hiragana, it is げん (Gen), old reading as け゚ん (Ngen).

The first recorded mention of a person surnamed Nguyen is a 317 CE description of a journey to Giao Châu undertaken by Eastern Jin dynasty officer  and his family. Many events in Vietnamese history have contributed to the name's prominence. In 1232, after usurping the Lý dynasty, Trần Thủ Độ forced the descendants of the Lý to change their surname to Nguyễn. When Hồ Quý Ly overturned the Trần dynasty, he killed many of their descendants so when the Hồ dynasty collapsed in 1407, many of his descendants changed their surname to Nguyễn in fear of retribution. In 1592, on the collapse of the Mạc dynasty, their descendants changed their surname to Nguyễn. In late 16th century, the Tư Mã clan from Thanh Hóa changed to Nguyễn and settled in Cochinchina. When the Nguyễn dynasty (the descendants of the Nguyễn Lords) took power in 1802, some of the descendants of the Trịnh Lords fearing retribution changed their surname to Nguyễn, while others fled north into China. The Nguyễn dynasty awarded many people the surname Nguyễn during their rule, and many criminals also changed their surname to Nguyễn to avoid prosecution.

Usage outside Vietnam
The prevalence of Nguyễn as a family name in Vietnam extends to outside the country, due to numerous and widespread Vietnamese emigrants. Outside Vietnam, the surname is commonly rendered without diacritics, as “Nguyen”. Nguyen was the seventh most common family name in Australia in 2006  (second only to Smith in Melbourne phone books), and the 54th most common in France. It was the 41st most common surname in Norway in 2020 and tops the foreign name list in the Czech Republic.

In the United States, Nguyen is the 38th most-common surname and is shared by more than 437,000 individuals, according to the 2010 Census; it was the 57th and 229th most-common surname, respectively, in the 2000 and 1990 censuses. It is also the most common exclusively East Asian surname. It is ranked 124th in the U.S. Social Security Index. Nguyen was the 57th most common surname in the whole of Australia in 2022.

Subfamilies 

In Vietnamese tradition, people are referred to by their personal names and not by their family names even in formal situations. However, some groups distinguish themselves from other Nguyễn by passing elements of their names that are usually considered middle names to their children. This practice is more common with male than with female children. Some of the prominent subgroups within the Nguyễn family are:

 Nguyễn Phước or Nguyễn Phúc (阮福): Surname for the Nguyễn Lords family members, and all members of the Nguyễn dynasty emperors.
 Nguyễn Đình 阮廷
 Nguyễn Hữu 阮有
 Nguyễn Cảnh 阮景
 Nguyễn Khắc 阮克
 Nguyễn Tiến 阮進
 Nguyễn Đức 阮德
 Nguyễn Minh 阮明
 Nguyễn Thanh 阮清
 Nguyễn Ngọc 阮玉
 Nguyễn Văn 阮文
 Nguyễn Quang 阮光
 Nguyễn Xuân 阮春
 Nguyễn Huy 阮輝
 Nguyễn Hoàng 阮黃
 Tôn Thất 尊室 (Tôn Nữ 尊女 for females): Surname for members of the Nguyễn dynasty royal family that were not direct descendants of the Emperor.

Pronunciation 
Finally,  occurs in the English word "net".

However, Nguyễn is also pronounced with a tone in Vietnamese. In Southern Vietnam, Nguyễn is pronounced with the dipping tone; the pitch of the voice first drops from a mid-level to the bottom of the speaker's range of pitch and then rises back to mid. In Northern Vietnam, it is pronounced with the creaky rising tone: the pitch of the voice rises from mid-level to the top of the speaker's range of pitch, but with constricted vocal cords, akin to a glottal stop in the middle of the vowel. See Vietnamese tones.

Changes of family name
There have been various points in Vietnam's history at which people have changed their family name to "Nguyễn."
When the Lý dynasty fell in 1232, Trần Thủ Độ, who orchestrated its overthrow, forced Lý's descendants to adopt the name due to the naming taboo surrounding Trần Lý, grandfather to emperor Trần Cảnh.

During almost 1000 years, from 457 to Hồ Quý Ly (1401), in Hải Dương and a part of Haiphong today there is the district of the Phí family (Vietnamese: huyện Phí Gia). At the end of the Lý and the Trần dynasty there were many people who changed their names to "Nguyễn" and "Nguyễn Phí." By the Lê dynasty, the court changed the name of the district to "Kim Thành."

When the Mạc dynasty fell in 1592, their descendants changed their family name to "Nguyễn."

Trần Quang Diệu (like his wife Bùi Thị Xuân) worked as a major officer for the Tây Sơn dynasty, against Nguyễn Ánh. After the Tây Sơn dynasty was defeated, his children adopted various names or changed names (one of them into "Nguyễn") in order to flee retaliation.

Historically in Vietnam and many East Asian countries, the rulers may let their courtiers share their family name as a reward for their loyalty. Many officials thereby changed their name to match that of the last Nguyễn dynasty (1802–1945). Civilians also adopted the name during the Trịnh–Nguyễn Civil War for purposes of social climbing, having migrated from the north to the south. Even the Tây Sơn Brothers changed their name to "Nguyễn" from "Hồ."

Notable people

People with the name include:
Heads of state (Nguyễn Minh Triết, Nguyễn Phú Trọng, Nguyễn Xuân Phúc, Nguyễn Xí, Nguyễn lords, Tây Sơn dynasty, Nguyễn dynasty, Nguyễn Văn Thiệu, Nguyễn Văn Xuân, Nguyễn Ngọc Thơ, Nguyễn Cao Kỳ...)
Poets (Nguyễn Trãi, Nguyễn Du, Nguyễn Đình Chiểu, Nguyễn Khoa Điềm).
Catholic clergymen (Nguyễn Văn Thuận)
Writers (Viet Thanh Nguyen)
Scientists (Nam-Trung Nguyen)
Composers, actors (Dustin Nguyen)
Models (Nguyễn Thúc Thùy Tiên)
Professional poker players (Scotty Nguyen)
Professional American football player (Dat Nguyen)
Professional footballer (Lee Nguyen)
Criminals (Nguyễn Tường Vân)

Hồ Chí Minh was born Nguyễn Sinh Cung and used various names with the surname Nguyễn throughout his career (Nguyễn Tất Thành, Nguyễn Ái Quốc). He was not known as Hồ Chí Minh until late in his life.

References

External links

Vietnamese-language surnames
Surnames of Vietnamese origin